Oberoendeframkallande is the fifth studio album by Swedish rapper Timbuktu. The album, produced by Breakmecanix, was released as both vinyl and compact disc, with both releases having slightly different track listings.

Track listing

Charts

Weekly charts

Year-end charts

References

2007 albums
Timbuktu (musician) albums